Mahabharata is a historical book retold by C. Rajagopalachari. It was first published by Bharatiya Vidya Bhavan in 1958. This book is an abridged English retelling of Vyasa's Mahabharata. Rajaji considered this book and his Ramayana to be his greatest service to his countrymen.

As of 2001, the book had sold over a million copies.

References

1958 non-fiction books
20th-century Indian books
Works based on the Mahabharata